Socrates has frequently been featured in or the subject of literature, theater, film, television, and art.

Art 

 The Apotheosis of Homer (1827)

 The Death of Socrates (1787)

 Double Herm of Socrates and Seneca (3rd century AD)

 The School of Athens (c. 1511)

 Socrates (c. 1950)

 Socrates, his two Wives, and Alcibiades (1660s)

 Symposium (Feuerbach) (1869)

Literature 

 Alcibiades the Schoolboy (1652)

 Creation (1981)
 Historical fiction novel by Gore Vidal in which a Achaemenid Persian diplomat meets historical figures, including Socrates

 De genio Socratis

 Divine Comedy

 The Just City (2015)

 The Last of the Wine (1956)

 The Plot to Save Socrates (2006)

Music 

 "Bruces' Philosophers Song" (1973)

 Der geduldige Socrates (1721)

 Serenade after Plato's "Symposium" (1954)

 Socrate (1919)

Screen 

 Barefoot in Athens (1966)
 Hallmark Hall of Fame television film on the last days of Socrates, starring Peter Ustinov as Socrates

 Bill & Ted's Excellent Adventure (1989)
 Science fiction comedy film in which time-traveling teenagers assemble historical figures, including Socrates, portrayed by Tony Steedman, for a high school presentation. The title characters continuously pronounce his name as the two syllable 'So-Crates'

 Meeting of Minds (1977–1981)

 The Philosophers' Football Match (1972), in which he scores the winning goal

 Socrates (1971)

Stage 

 The Clouds (423 BC)
 Ancient Greek comedy by Aristophanes that lampoons intellectualism in classical Athens; Socrates features prominently

 Socrates (1759)

 Socrates on Trial'' (2007)